This list is of the Historic Sites of Japan located within the Prefecture of Aichi.

National Historic Sites
As of 1 September 2019, forty Sites in Aichi have been designated by the Japanese government's Agency for Cultural Affairs (of the Ministry of Education, Culture, Sports, Science and Technology) as being of national significance (including one *Special Historic Site).

|-

|-

|-

|-

|-

|-

|-

|-

|-

|-
|-
|-

|-

|-
|-

|-

|-

|-

|-

|-

|-

|-

|-

|-

|-

|-

|-

|-

|-

|-

|-

|-

|-
|-

|-

|-

|-

|-

|-

|-

|-

|-

|-

|-
|}

Prefectural Historic Sites
As of 1 May 2019, forty-three Sites have been designated by the prefectural government of Aichi as being of prefectural importance.

Municipal Historic Sites
As of 1 May 2019, a further four hundred and forty-three Sites have been designated by municipal governments in Aichi as being of municipal importance.

See also

 Cultural Properties of Japan
 Owari Province
 Mikawa Province
 List of Places of Scenic Beauty of Japan (Aichi)

References

External links
  Cultural Properties of Aichi Prefecture
  Historic Sites of Aichi Prefecture

Aichi Prefecture
 Aichi